Input port may refer to:

 Input device, a generic term for any device that provides input to a system
 Parallel port, a computer hardware interface
 Serial port, a computer hardware interface
 Universal Serial Bus, a computer hardware interface
 IEEE 1394 interface, a computer hardware interface, known commonly as Firewire
 PS/2 connector, a common computer interface for mice and keyboards

See also
 Output device
 Peripheral device
 Computer hardware
 Computer keyboard
 Mouse (computer)